Sofiane Azzedine  (born 24 September 1980) is an Algerian football goalkeeper who plays for MC Alger in the Algerian Ligue Professionnelle 1. He played a major role in qualifying the club to the Algerian Cup Final in 2007.

Club career
On January 21, 2011, Azzedine signed an 18-month contract with MC Alger.

References

External links
 DZFoot Profile

1980 births
Living people
Algerian footballers
MC Alger players
US Biskra players
JSM Béjaïa players
Association football goalkeepers
21st-century Algerian people